HMS Sparkler was an Acute-class gunvessel launched in 1797 as GB No.7 and renamed HMS Sparkler in August 1797. She served the Royal Navy during the French Revolutionary Wars. The Navy sold her in 1802. She became a merchantman. In 1813 a French privateer captured her but the Royal Navy recaptured her shortly thereafter. She was wrecked in February 1814.

Career
Lieutenant Austin Terman commissioned Sparkler in April 1797 for the Channel. In June 1798  Lieutenant William Walker replaced Terman.

On 27 June 1800 on Mr. William O'Kelly, Sparklers surgeon, came before a Court-martial  aboard , at Portsmouth harbour. Lieutenant Walker charged Kelly with having behaved in a mutinous, riotous, and disorderly manner. The Court found the charges proved in part and sentence Mr. O'Kelly two years in Marshalsea Prison, and to forfeit his pay.

Less than a week later, on 2 July 1800, Lieutenant Walker himself faced a Court-martial aboard Gladiator. The court found Walker guilty of a number of offences, including theft of provisions, enrolling his one-year old son as an Able Seaman, and covering up crew desertions while drawing full provisions. The Court found the charges had in part been proven and dismissed Walker from the Navy.

Lieutenant John Stevens took command of Sparkler in August 1800.

In company with other Royal Navy sloops and gun-vessels drove two French sloops ashore at Grandcamp Bay in Northern France on 19 Aug 1800, and destroyed them.

He sent Lieutenant M'Cullen of the Royal Marines with 24 picked men in Badgers ten-oared galley and six-oared cutter to catch the French vessel. He also signaled Sparkler to draw the fire of two shore batteries, one of two 24-pounder guns and one of two 12-pounder guns, while Badgers boats cut out the French vessel. The French crew ran their cutter on shore and cut her masts and rigging. Nevertheless, the British towed her off despite heavy small-arms fire from the shore. The prize was the privateer rowboat Victoire, mounting four swivel guns, 26 oars, and having a crew of at least 40 men, under the command of Captain Barier. Price described her as "quite new... the completest Boat for the Service of the Islands that possibly could be constructed." The only British casualty was Badgers gunners mate, who took a musket ball to the shoulder.

Lieutenant William Dick replaced Stevens in 1801 before Sparkler departed for the Baltic.

Sparkler joined Admiral Hyde Parker's North Sea Fleet at Yarmouth to take part in the expedition to the Baltic, which had as its objective to compel the Danes to abandon the League of Armed Neutrality. In March Cruizer sailed with Parker's fleet from Yarmouth roads for Copenhagen. Sparklers crew received head money for the engagement at Copenhagen on 2 April. she did not actually participate in the battle and so her crew was not listed among those qualifying for the clasp "Copenhagen" to Naval General Service Medal.

Disposal
Following the Treaty of Amiens, the "Principal Officers and Commissioners of His Majesty's Navy" offered the "Sparkler Gun-Vessel, 160 Tons, Copper-bottomed", lying at Sheerness, for sale on 9 September 1802. She sold then.

Merchantman
Sparkler then became a merchantman. She was raised in 1803 and given a new top and sides of fir plank.

She first appeared in the online copies of the registers in the 1804 volume of the Register of Shipping (RS). She first appeared in Lloyd's Register (LR) in the volume for 1805.

On 3 December 1812 the French privateer Augusta, of 14 guns and 120 men, from Saint-Malo, captured several British merchantmen near Scilly. One of the captured vessels was Sparkler, Brown, master, which had been sailing from Cadiz to London. Auguste put Sparklers crew, as well as that of two other merchantmen, aboard Mary, which Auguste then released. Mary arrived at Plymouth on 30 December.

On 23 December  and the hired armed cutter Nimrod were in company when they recaptured the English brig Sparkler, A. Brown, master. Nimrod sent Sparkler into Portland Roads.

Having been captured and recaptured, Sparkler apparently changed masters, and perhaps owner, a change that was not reflected in Lloyd's Register. The next mention of Sparkler was that on 11 July 1813 she had arrived at Gravesend from Memel, with Kieth, master.

Loss
In February 1814 the transport Sparkler, Keith, master, was driven ashore and wrecked at Bayonne. The French took the crew prisoner.

Citations

References
 

1797 ships
Gunvessels of the Royal Navy
Age of Sail merchant ships of England
Captured ships
Maritime incidents in 1814